Lena-Winslow High School, dedicated December 7, 1958 and affectionately known as "Le-Win", is a high school located in the town of Lena, Illinois.  Part of the Lena-Winslow Community Unit School District, Le-Win became the second largest school district in Stephenson County, when, in 1949, the State of Illinois mandated that larger school districts be created.  Only the districts of Dakota and Freeport are larger.

Facilities
Lena-Winslow Community Unit No. 202 includes students from the villages of Lena, Winslow, McConnell, Eleroy and Waddams Grove. Because only Lena and Winslow had High Schools, their names were both given to the new union. Originally the high school was provided with students from 21 rural elementary schools including McConnell, Eleroy, and Waddams Grove, as well as the elementary schools in Lena and Winslow.  Currently, all students within the CUSD attend Lena-Winslow Elementary and Jr. High prior to attending the high school.

Academics
Based on the Illinois School Report Card for the 2018-19 school year, Lena-Winslow had a graduation rate of 96% and an Advanced Placement participation rate of 45%. Additionally, in 2019, Le-Win ranked as the 9,338th best school in the United States, 278th in Illinois and 1st in the Freeport metro area based on U.S. News & World Report.

Athletics
The Panthers compete in the Northwest Upstate Illini Conference.  They participate in several IHSA sponsored athletics and activities, including; football, cross country, girls volleyball, boys & girls basketball, wrestling, boys & girls golf, boys & girls track & field, baseball, softball, speech, and music.

Teams

The following teams finished in the top four of their respective IHSA sponsored state championship tournaments:

Baseball: 4th place (2011-2012)
Basketball (boys):  4th place (1983–84)
Football:  1A Semi-Finalist (2009–10) 1A State Champions (2010–11) 1A State Champions (2013–14) 1A State Champions (2017–18) 1A State Champions (2019–20) 1A State Champions (2021–22) 1A State Champions (2022–23)
Track & Field (boys):  2nd place (1992-1993)
Volleyball (girls):  4th place (2002–03)
Wrestling (boys): 2nd place (2011-2012)1A State Champions (2016-2017)1A State Champions (2018-2019)3rd place (2022-2023)

Individual

The following athletes finished the season as state champion:

School Song
Wave the Flag (For Le-Win High School) is the fight song for Lena-Winslow's athletic teams, adapted from the University of Chicago Maroons. The tune was adapted by the University of Chicago from Miami University's "Marching Song" written in 1908 by Raymond H. Burke, a University of Chicago graduate who joined Miami's faculty in 1906.

Lyrics
Wave the flag of Le-Win High School,
Black and gold so grand.
Ever shall our team be victors
Known throughout the land.
You, Rah, RahWe will always be there fighting,Without a fear we'll stand.Wave the flag of le-win colors,Black and gold for Le-Win High.''

References

External links
Dedication of Lena-Winslow High School
Lena-Winslow High School Home Page
Fight Song Composers and Copyright Years
University of Chicago Cheers

Public high schools in Illinois
Schools in Stephenson County, Illinois
1958 establishments in Illinois